Oakeshott is a surname, and may refer to:

 Ewart Oakeshott (1916–2002), British illustrator, collector, and amateur historian
Grace Oakeshott (1872–1929), British activist for women's rights
 Isabel Oakeshott, British political journalist and non-fiction author
 Matthew Oakeshott, Baron Oakeshott of Seagrove Bay (born 1947), British Liberal Democrat politician
 Michael Oakeshott (1901–1990), English philosopher
 Rob Oakeshott (born 1969), Australian politician
 Walter Fraser Oakeshott (1903–1987), schoolmaster and Oxford college head

See also

 Oakeshott typology